The Lecce–Otranto railway is an Italian  long railway line, that connects Lecce with Zollino, Maglie and Otranto. The route operates through the region of Apulia.

History

The line was opened in stages between 1868 and 1872.

Usage
The line is used by the following service(s):

Local services (Treno regionale) Lecce–Zollino–Nardo–Gallipoli
Local services (Treno regionale) Zollino– Maglie–Tricase–Gagliano
Local services (Treno regionale) Maglie–Otranto

See also 
 List of railway lines in Italy

References

This article is based upon a translation of the Italian-language version as at February 2015.

External links 

Railway lines in Apulia
Railway lines opened in 1868